Tibor Čiča (born 31 December 1993) is a Swedish-born Croatian footballer who plays for IFK Simrishamn.

Club career
Born in Sweden to Croatian parents, Čiča started playing football at the age of 5, for the local Croatian immigrant football team NK Croatia Malmö. He moved afterwards to the youth ranks of the local giant Malmö FF, but at the age of 15, moved to the youth side of the newly merged IF Limhamn Bunkeflo. Čiča debuted in 2009 for the senior squad of his third-tier team aged only 15, scoring the match-winning goal. He also starred that year in the documentary "I Zlatans fotspår" ("In Zlatans footsteps"), a competition for the most talented young player of the Malmö region, where he emerged as the winner. He got more chances in the 2010 season of Division 1 Södra, establishing himself in the first team squad, and earning a call-up for the Croatian U-17 national football team.

Cesena
He was snapped up by the Serie A team A.C. Cesena in February 2011, signing a 3-year professional contract for them in September 2011. On 10 August 2012, Čiča joined Croatian 1.HNL side NK Zagreb on a one-year loan. In February 2013, Zagreb loaned him to Croatian 2. HNL team HNK Gorica.

In March 2014 he was signed by FC Höllviken.

References

1993 births
Living people
Footballers from Malmö
Association football midfielders
Swedish footballers
Croatian footballers
Croatia youth international footballers
IF Limhamn Bunkeflo (men) players
A.C. Cesena players
NK Zagreb players
HNK Gorica players
S.C. Olhanense players
Höllvikens GIF players
BW 90 IF players
Ettan Fotboll players
Croatian Football League players
Croatian expatriate footballers
Swedish expatriate footballers
Expatriate footballers in Italy
Swedish expatriate sportspeople in Italy
Expatriate footballers in Portugal
Croatian expatriate sportspeople in Portugal
Swedish expatriate sportspeople in Portugal